Misdemeanor is the first studio album from Swedish female stoner rock band Misdemeanor.

Track listing

 "Let Me Know" (3:41)
 "Not The One" (3:59)
 "Annoying" (3:13)
 "Mastery" (3:27)
 "The Beer Hunter" (5:36)
 "Knowing" (4:18)
 "Parashoot" (3:50)
 "It's So Big" (3:10)
 "Trust" (3:18)
 "6R12" (2:31)

Personnel
 Vera Olofsson: vocals
 Jenny Möllberg: guitar
 Sara Fredriksson: guitar
 Jenny Lindahl: bass
 Mia Möllberg: drums

Additional personnel
Richard Ankers - Percussion, Drums
Dick Aschenbrenner - Art Direction
Johan Bååth - Vocals (background), Choir, Chorus
George Bravo - Engineer, Recording
John Brinck - Photography
Kurt Dräckes - Vocals, Choir, Chorus
Nico Elgstrand - Mixing, Mixing Engineer
Alex Hellid - Producer, Art Direction
Anders Lindström - Piano
Jenny Möllberg - Guitar, Vocals (background), Slide Guitar
Mia Möllberg - Drums, Photography
Vera Olofsson - Vocals, Choir, Chorus
Christofer Stannow - Mastering, Mastering Engineer
Sarah Thyséll - Vocals (background)

2002 albums
Misdemeanor (Swedish band) albums